In enzymology, a vomilenine glucosyltransferase is an enzyme that catalyzes the chemical reaction

UDP-glucose + vomilenine  UDP + raucaffricine

Thus, the two substrates of this enzyme are UDP-glucose and vomilenine, whereas its two products are UDP and raucaffricine.

This enzyme belongs to the family of glycosyltransferases, specifically the hexosyltransferases.  The systematic name of this enzyme class is UDP-glucose:vomilenine 21-O-beta-D-glucosyltransferase. This enzyme is also called UDPG:vomilenine 21-beta-D-glucosyltransferase.  This enzyme participates in indole and ipecac alkaloid biosynthesis.

References

 
 
 

EC 2.4.1
Enzymes of unknown structure